Leo O'Kelly (born 27 November 1949, Carlow, County Carlow, Ireland) is an Irish singer-songwriter, multi-instrumentalist, and producer. He is mainly known as a member of the Irish folk duo Tír na nÓg. After the band broke up, he produced albums on Polydor and EMI labels for other Irish artists like Restless Nights in 1975 by Ray Dolan who wrote "Hey Friend" on the first Tír na nÓg LP. In 2000, Leo released his first solo album called Glare, then Proto in 2003 which consists in a collection of songs that he recorded between 1975 and 2001 whose one is a cover with Mark Gilligan of Nick Drake's "Northern Sky" and another is a vocal improvisation by his son, Aaron O'Kelly, at the age of 1. His third album, Will, was released in February 2011 and features the poems of John McKenna set to music.

Discography

With Tír na nÓg
 Tír na nÓg (1971)
 A Tear and a Smile (1972)
 Strong in the Sun (1973)
 In the Morning (1999)
 Hibernian (2000)
 Spotlight (2001)
 Live at Sirius (2010)

Solo
 "Portsmouth" from 10 Years On by various artists (1977)
 "Love Go Round" from Snakes & Ladders by various artists (1996)
 Glare (2001)
 Proto (2003)
 Will (2011)

With Carrier Frequency
 "Telecaster Man" (1989) 12" single

As producer
 Loudest Whisper – The Children of Lir (1974)
 Ray Dolan – Restless Night (1975)
 Gemma Hasson – Looking for the Morning (1975)
 Crubeen – Eagles Whistle (1976)
 The Sands Family – After the Morning (1976)
 Aileach – Ard Rí (1977)
 Various Artists – 10 Years On (1977)
 Various Artists – The Best of Irish Folk (1977)
 Azure Days – "Blew My Clouds Away"/"My Mexican" 7" single (1987)

External links
Official Web Site

References

Irish folk musicians
Irish rock musicians
Musicians from County Carlow
1949 births
Living people